Wulna (Wuna) is an extinct indigenous language of Australia. It had one speaker left in 1981. It is poorly attested and only tentatively classified as being related to Limilngan.

The State Library of New South Wales has an original copy of Vocabulary of the Woolner District Dialect, Adelaide River, Northern Territory by John W. O. Bennett (published in 1869) which it has made available online as scanned images. The book documents the vocabulary and pronunciation of Wulna in general, in addition to place names from the Adelaide River region of Norther Territory. The original copy has been annotated by Paul Foelsche, the first police inspector of Northern Territory, who has added his own words to the vocabulary list, and his own corrections on pronunciation.

External links
 Paradisec has an open access collection of Gavan Breen's materials for Wulna
 A scanned online copy of Vocabulary of the Woolner District Dialect, Adelaide River, Northern Territory by John W. O. Bennett (published 1869, annotated by Paul Foelsche),  on the State Library of New South Wales' website

References

Limilngan–Wulna languages
Endangered indigenous Australian languages in the Northern Territory